Soccer at the 2013 Canada Summer Games may refer to: 

Men's soccer at the 2013 Canada Summer Games
Women's soccer at the 2013 Canada Summer Games